Minuscule 240 (in the Gregory-Aland numbering), Zε21 (Soden), is a Greek minuscule manuscript of the New Testament, on parchment. Paleographically it had been assigned to the 12th century.

Description 

The codex contains the text of the four Gospels, on 411 parchment leaves (size ), with some lacunae (Mark 8:12-34; 14:17-54; Luke 15:32-16:8). The text is written in one column per page, 33-39 lines per page.

The biblical text is surrounded by a commentary of Euthymius Zigabenus. The biblical text written in red, the text of a commentary in black ink.

Text 

The Greek text of the codex is a representative of the Byzantine text-type. Aland placed it in Category V.
It was not examined by the Claremont Profile Method.

History 

Formerly the manuscript was held in the monastery Philotheus at Athos peninsula, then in the Dionysius monastery. It was brought from the Athos to Moscow, by the monk Arsenius, on the suggestion of the Patriarch Nikon, in the reign of Alexei Mikhailovich Romanov (1645-1676). The manuscript was collated by C. F. Matthaei.

The manuscript is currently housed at the State Historical Museum (V. 87, S. 48) at Moscow.

See also 

 List of New Testament minuscules
 Biblical manuscript
 Textual criticism

References

Further reading 

 C. F. Matthaei, Novum Testamentum Graece et Latine (Riga, 1782). (as i)
 Kurt Treu, Die Griechischen Handschriften des Neuen Testaments in der UdSSR; eine systematische Auswertung des Texthandschriften in Leningrad, Moskau, Kiev, Odessa, Tbilisi und Erevan, T & U 90 (Berlin, 1966), pp. 270–272.

Greek New Testament minuscules
12th-century biblical manuscripts